Bystrzanowice  is a village in the administrative district of Gmina Janów, within Częstochowa County, Silesian Voivodeship, in southern Poland.

The village has a population of 296.

References

Bystrzanowice